Forward is a relative direction, the opposite of backward.

Forward may also refer to:

People 
Forward (surname)

Sports
 Forward (association football)
 Forward (basketball), including:
 Point forward
 Power forward (basketball)
 Small forward
 Forward (ice hockey)
 Power forward (ice hockey)
 In rugby football:
 Forwards (rugby league), in rugby league football
 Forwards (rugby union), in rugby union football
 Forward Sports, a Pakistan sportswear brand
 BK Forward, a Swedish club for association football and bandy

Politics
 Avante (political party) (Portuguese for forward), a political party in Brazil
 Forward (Belgium), a political party in Belgium
 Forward (Denmark), a political party in Denmark
 Forward (Greenland), a political party in Greenland
 Forward Party (United States), a centrist American political party
 Kadima (Hebrew for forward), a political party in Israel
 La République En Marche! (sometimes translated as Forward!), a political party in France
 Socialist League Vpered ("Forward"), a political party in Russia

Geography

Canada
 Forward, Saskatchewan

United States
 Forward, Wisconsin
 Forward Township, Allegheny County, Pennsylvania
 Forward Township, Butler County, Pennsylvania

Books and publications
 Forward!, a 1985 collection of short stories by Gordon R. Dickson
 Forward: Stories of Tomorrow, a 2019 collection of science fiction short stories by various authors
 Forward Prizes for Poetry
 The Forward, a Jewish-American, Yiddish/English newspaper from New York
 Forward (Scottish newspaper), socialist weekly founded in 1906
 Forward (Sri Lanka), a defunct English-language Communist Party weekly newspaper
 Forward (Syrian magazine), an English-language newsmagazine 2009-2011
 Avante! ("Forward!"), a publication of the Portuguese Communist Party
 Avanti! (Italian newspaper) ("Forward!"), a publication of the Italian Socialist Party
 Eteenpäin ("Forward"), a Communist Party USA Finnish-language newspaper in the United States
 Új Előre ("New Forward"), a Communist Hungarian-language newspaper in the United States
 Vorwärts ("Forward"), a publication of the Social Democratic Party of Germany
 Vorwärts! ("Forward!"), a radical German-language paper published in Paris in 1844, covering art and culture
 Vorwärts (Czechoslovak newspaper) ("Forward!"), a newspaper of the Communist Party of Czechoslovakia

Mottos and slogans 
"Forward", Wisconsin state motto
"Forward", 2012 Barack Obama presidential campaign slogan

Music
 Forward (The Abyssinians album), 1982
 Forward (Ayla Brown album) or the title song, 2006
 Forward (Flame album), 2015
 Forward (Hoobastank album), 2000
 Forward (Turn album) or the title song, 2003
 "Naprej, zastava slave" ("Forward, the Flag of Glory"), the former Slovene anthem, originally titled "Naprej" (Forward!)
 "Forward" (song), by Beyoncé, 2016
 "Forward", a song by Band-Maid from Maid in Japan

Other uses
 Email forwarding, a mechanism by which a mail server sends the emails of one of its users to another address.
 Forward (aircraft), front part of an aircraft, spacecraft, or ship
 Forward declaration in computer programming, is a partial declaration before it is completely defined
 Forward converter, electronic circuit
 Forward contract, a financial agreement to buy or sell an asset at a pre-agreed future point
 Isuzu Forward, trucks made by Isuzu
 Foundation for Women's Health, Research and Development, a British charity
 Forward, a sculpture by Raymond Mason (sculptor), located in Birmingham before being destroyed by arson
 Forward, a statue by Jean Pond Miner Coburn in Madison, Wisconsin

See also
 Forwarding (disambiguation)
 Foreword (disambiguation)